Murder Files, also known as Witness Murder Files, is a British crime documentary television series filmed in the United Kingdom in England.  The first and only series debuted on Channel 5 on 28 February 2013.

Synopsis
The series takes an in-depth look at some of Britain's most high-profile murders in recent memory and examines just how police nabbed the culprits through interviews with the victim's family members and police detectives.

Episodes

The Haircut Killer
Episode 1 examines the criminal career of murderer Danilo Restivo, specifically the death of mother, Heather Barnett. It aired on 14 May 2013.

The Sketchbook Killer
Episode 2 looks at the criminal career of John Sweeney.  The episode aired on 12 June 2013.

Killer on the Run
Episode 3 takes a look at Neil Entwistle, who murdered his wife and child.  It aired on 5 June 2013.

The Schoolboy Assassin
Episode 4 involves a teenager who is suspected of murdering a waiter.  It was the premiere episode, which aired on 28 February 2013.

Home media
The programme was released on 31 December 2016 on Netflix in the United States and remained on the platform as of September 2017.  On the streaming site, the episodes appear in the order of "The Haircut Killer," "The Schoolboy Assassin," "The Sketchbook Killer," and "Killer on the Run."

References

External links
 

2013 British television series debuts
2013 British television series endings
2010s British drama television series
British crime drama television series
British crime television series
British drama television series
British documentary television series
English-language television shows
Television shows set in England
Television shows set in the United Kingdom
2010s British crime television series